Cenulph may refer to:

Coenwulf of Mercia (died AD 821), King of Mercia
Cynewulf of Wessex (died AD 786), King of Wessex